Hannelore Valencak (23 January 1929 – 9 April 2004) was an Austrian physicist, novelist, poet and children's writer.

Biography
Born in Leoben, Styria, Valencak studied physics at Graz University, graduating in 1955. She then worked as a metalurigist for Felten und Guilleaume in Kapfenberg. Her first husband, Oskar Kofler, died in a road accident in 1959. In 1962, she married Viktor Mayer and moved to Vienna, where she worked as a patent expert. From 1975, she devoted herself entirely to her writing.

Valencak first started to publish her work in 1951, initially in poetry and literary journals. Her most fruitful period of writing was from 1961 to 1981 when she published her first and last novels. In later life she withdrew from public attention with the result that her works were largely forgotten when she died in 2004. Interest was however revived in 2006 when her third novel Zuflucht hinter der Zeit was republished as Das Fenster zum Sommer (The Window to Summer) attracting considerable acclaim.

Selected works
Among Valencak's many publications are the following:

1961: Morgen werden wir es wissen, short stories
1961: Die Höhlen Noahs, novel
1964: Ein fremder Garten novel
1966: Nur dieses eine Leben, poetry
1967: Zuflucht hinter der Zeit novel (republished as Das Fenster zum Sommer, 2006)
1970: Montag früh ist nicht das Leben, for children
1972: Vorhof der Wirklichkeit, novel
1974: Icb bin Barbara, for children, translated into English as When Half-Gods Go (1976)
1975: Meine schwererziehbare Tante, youth novel
1976: Regenzauber, youth novel, translated into English as A Tangled Web (1978)
1978: Das Treueversprechen, youth novel
1981: Das magische Tagebuch novel
1983: Mein Tag - mein Jahr, poetry, written jointly with Doris Mühringer
1898: Bettina und das eiserne Versprechen, youth novel 
2008: Ausgewählte Gedichte, poetry collection

References

1981 births
2004 deaths
People from Leoben
Austrian physicists
Austrian women novelists
Austrian women poets
20th-century women writers
Austrian children's writers
Austrian women children's writers
20th-century poets
20th-century Austrian novelists